Chislehurst and Sidcup Urban District was a local government district and civil parish in north west Kent, England from 1934 to 1965.

It was formed in 1934 from the former area of Chislehurst Urban District, Sidcup Urban District and part of Bromley Rural District.

London Boroughs
In 1965 the parish and urban district were abolished and the settlements split again, roughly by the A20 road. Chislehurst became part of the London Borough of Bromley while Sidcup and North Cray formed part of the London Borough of Bexley in Greater London.

References

External links
Ideal Homes - London Borough of Bexley
Vision of Britain - Historic boundaries

History of the London Borough of Bromley
History of the London Borough of Bexley
Districts abolished by the London Government Act 1963
Urban districts of England
Chislehurst
Sidcup